The 2018 Clemson  Tigers football team represented Clemson University during the 2018 NCAA Division I FBS football season. The Tigers played their home games at Memorial Stadium, also known as "Death Valley," and competed in the Atlantic Division of the Atlantic Coast Conference. They were led by head coach Dabo Swinney in his tenth full year and 11th overall since taking over midway through 2008 season.

Clemson, coming off a College Football Playoff semi-final loss to Alabama in 2017, began the year ranked second in the preseason AP Poll and Coaches Poll. The Tigers won all 12 of their regular season games, securing their first undefeated regular season since 2015. Clemson won their fourth consecutive ACC title by defeating Pittsburgh in the 2018 ACC Championship Game. In the final College Football Playoff rankings of the 2018 season, Clemson was ranked second, earning them their fourth consecutive playoff bid and a spot in the 2018 Cotton Bowl Classic against third-ranked Notre Dame. The Tigers won that game 30–3, advancing them to the 2019 College Football Playoff National Championship against Alabama, their fourth consecutive year meeting the Crimson Tide in the playoff and third time in four years doing so in the national title game. Clemson won that game in dominant fashion, 44–16, to win the Tigers' third national championship in school history and second in three years. They were the first undefeated College Football Playoff champion and the first major college football program to finish with a record of 15–0 since Penn in 1897. The team is considered by some analysts to be one of the greatest in college football history.

The Tigers were led offensively by true freshman quarterback Trevor Lawrence, who won a highly publicized battle for the starting role over 2017 starter Kelly Bryant. Sophomore running back Travis Etienne contributed significantly, rushing for over 1,600 yards and an FBS-leading 24 rushing touchdowns. He was named ACC Player of the Year following the regular season. On defense, the team was anchored by a highly touted, veteran defensive line consisting of Clelin Ferrell, Christian Wilkins, Dexter Lawrence, and Austin Bryant—all of whom were subsequently drafted in the 2019 NFL Draft.

Previous season

The Tigers finished the 2017 season 12–2, 7–1 in ACC play to finish in first place in the Atlantic Division. They won the ACC for the third consecutive season by beating Miami in the ACC Championship Game, 38–3. Clemson received their third straight bid to the College Football Playoff, earning the number one seed. The Tigers fell to fourth-seeded and eventual national champion Alabama in the semifinal game, the Sugar Bowl, 6–24.

Offseason

Position key

Offseason departures

NFL draftees

Transfers

^ Prior to the season, C.J. Fuller decided to transfer from the program.  However, on October 3, 2018, before he elected a school to transfer to, Fuller died due to a blood clot in his lung. Fuller, age 22, had had surgery two weeks before his death.

 Kelly Bryant decided to transfer schools after playing in four games during the 2018 season.

Recruits
The Tigers signed a total of 17 recruits, 15 on early signing day and 2 on National Signing Day. The 2018 class was ranked as the best in the ACC and the seventh best nationally by the 247Sports.com Composite Rankings.

Returning starters

Preseason

Award watch lists
Listed in the order that they were released

ACC media poll
The ACC media poll was released on July 24, 2018. Clemson was the consensus pick to repeat as ACC Champion, receiving 145 votes out of 148 to win the Atlantic Division and 139 of 148 votes to win the Conference Championship.

Schedule
Clemson announced its 2018 football schedule on January 17, 2018. The 2018 schedule consisted of seven home games and five away games in the regular season. The Tigers hosted ACC foes Syracuse, NC State, Louisville, and Duke and traveled to Georgia Tech, Wake Forest, Florida State and Boston College.

The Tigers hosted three of the four non-conference opponents, Furman from the Southern Conference, Georgia Southern from Sun Belt Conference and South Carolina from the SEC, and traveled to Texas A&M from the SEC.

Schedule Source:

Personnel

Coaching staff

Roster

Source:

Depth chart

Depth chart shown is one released for Oct 20 game vs. NC State.

Rankings

Game summaries

Furman

Clemson's first game of the year was against in-state FCS foe Furman. Clemson won in a blowout, 48–7.

The Tigers' quarterback situation had dominated discussion of the team in the offseason, with 2017 starter Kelly Bryant in jeopardy of losing the starting job to highly touted true freshman Trevor Lawrence. The week before the season opener, head coach Dabo Swinney announced that Bryant would start the game against Furman but Lawrence would see significant playing time. Swinney stuck to the game plan, as Bryant played the first quarter, Lawrence the second, and each quarterback played in two drives to start the second half.

Clemson opened the scoring in the first quarter with a 40 yard touchdown pass from Kelly Bryant to Amari Rodgers. The next drive ended with a 35-yard field goal from kicker Greg Huegel to make the score 10–0. Trevor Lawrence's first drive in the second quarter also ended with a field goal by Huegel, this time from 49 yards. The next drive was an 11-play, 95-yard drive that ended with Lawrence's first career touchdown, a six-yard pass from Lawrence to Diondre Overton. Travis Etienne added another touchdown on the ground before the half to make the score 27–0. In the second half, Kelly Bryant scored on a 35-yard touchdown run, and Trevor Lawrence added two more touchdowns through the air. Furman scored their first points via a 16-yard touchdown pass with 1:18 left to go, bringing the final score to 48–7.

at Texas A&M

In Clemson's second game of the season, the Tigers traveled to College Station, Texas to play Texas A&M of the SEC. Clemson held off a late Texas A&M comeback attempt to win 28–26.

Dabo Swinney again said he intended to play both Kelly Bryant and Trevor Lawrence at quarterback in the game against Texas A&M, as he did against Furman in week 1. Bryant started the game, scoring on a one-yard touchdown run late in the first quarter to take a 7–3 lead over the Aggies. Trevor Lawrence was brought in in the second quarter, completing a 64-yard touchdown pass to Tee Higgins on his first pass attempt, bringing the score to 14–3. A 50-yard field goal attempt by Texas A&M was blocked by Dexter Lawrence in the second quarter. Trevor Lawrence and Bryant struggled to score for the rest of the half, however, and the 14–3 score carried into halftime. In the third quarter, Clemson and Texas A&M traded touchdowns for several drives. Kelly Bryant completed an eight-yard touchdown pass to Diondre Overton to make the score 21–6 in favor of Clemson, which was answered by a nine-yard touchdown pass by Texas A&M's Kellen Mond to Kendrick Rogers. Clemson's Travis Etienne capped off a 75-yard drive with a one-yard touchdown run, and Texas A&M responded with another touchdown pass from Kellen Mond to bring the score to 28–20 Clemson. The Aggies were poised to score with less than two minutes remaining in the fourth quarter, but wide receiver Quartney Davis fumbled the ball near the goal line, which was ruled to have gone out of bounds in the endzone, resulting in a touchback and Clemson's ball. The Aggies forced a three-and-out, however, and regained possession with 1:12 left to play. Kellen Mond's offense marched down the field and scored a 24-yard touchdown completion to Kendrick Rogers with 46 seconds to go. The Aggies' two-point try to potentially tie the game ended with a Kellen Mond interception, however, and Clemson ran out the clock to end the game.

Georgia Southern

Clemson's third game of the season, a home game against Georgia Southern of the Sun Belt Conference, was put in jeopardy by Hurricane Florence. The hurricane made landfall near Wrightsville Beach, North Carolina the day before the game was set to be played, and was forecast to move south toward South Carolina late Saturday. Clemson officials decided not to cancel or change the location of the game, as was being done for other football games being played in the Carolinas that weekend, but did move game time up to noon from its originally scheduled time of 4:30 p.m. Clemson won the game 38–7 in front of a packed crowd at Memorial Stadium.

Clemson followed the pattern of its previous two games by starting Kelly Bryant at quarterback but bringing in Trevor Lawrence for equal playing time. The Tigers three drives in the first quarter all failed to score, ending with an interception thrown by Bryant, a missed field goal, and a fumble by Adam Choice, respectively. In the second quarter, Trevor Lawrence led a  93-yard drive that ended with a one-yard touchdown run by Travis Etienne. Bryant began the following drive at quarterback but came off the field due to an apparent injury. Two plays later, Trevor Lawrence completed a 57-yard touchdown pass to Justyn Ross. Clemson's next drive ended in a one-yard touchdown run by Tavien Feaster, bringing the score to 21–0 just before the half. In the second half, Kelly Bryant did not return from his injury, which head coach Dabo Swinney described as a chest bruise. After Clemson scored a 37-yard field goal by kicker Greg Huegel, Georgia Southern scored their only touchdown on the day early in the fourth quarter via a six-yard touchdown run by Shai Werts. Travis Etienne scored on a 40-yard touchdown run later in the quarter, which was followed by a 10-yard touchdown run by Adam Choice to bring the final score to 38–7. Etienne finished with a career-best 162 yards rushing and two touchdowns in the game. Trevor Lawrence improved his career best to 194 passing yards to go along with one touchdown and one interception.

at Georgia Tech

Clemson opened its ACC conference schedule with a road game against Georgia Tech. The Tigers won convincingly, 49–21.

For what would prove to be the final time, Kelly Bryant started the game at quarterback. He played only two drives in the first half, both of which ended in punts, and after which Trevor Lawrence was brought in. Clemson's first score of the game was a fumble recovery in the end zone by Clelin Ferrell. The Tigers' next score came from a 17-yard touchdown pass from Trevor Lawrence to Hunter Renfrow. A 53-yard touchdown pass from Lawrence to Justyn Ross on the next drive made the game 21–0 in the second quarter. On the next drive, an intended screen pass from Lawrence deflected off a Clemson lineman and was caught by Georgia Tech's Desmond Branch. Georgia Tech then scored their lone points of the first half via an 11-yard touchdown run by TaQuon Marshall. Clemson led another touchdown drive, ending in a 3-yard pass from Lawrence to Travis Etienne, just before the half to make the score 28–7.  The third quarter featured touchdown runs by Tavien Feater and Etienne, after which the score was 42–7. Georgia Tech added touchdowns via a two-yard score by Nathan Cottrell and a five-yard pass from Tobias Oliver to Clinton Lynch. The last score of the game was a 30-yard touchdown pass from Trevor Lawrence to Tee Higgins. Lawrence finished the day with 176 passing yards, four touchdown passes and one interception.

Syracuse

Clemson's next game was their conference home opener against Syracuse, the team that had given Clemson their sole regular season loss the previous year. The Tigers led a fourth quarter comeback to win the 2018 match-up, 27–23.

The Clemson quarterback situation came to a head during the week leading up to the game. Head coach Dabo Swinney decided that Trevor Lawrence would be the starter going forward, supplanting 2017 starter Kelly Bryant, who had started each of the first four games but split drives with Lawrence. The next day, Bryant announced he intended to transfer schools. In order to take advantage of a new NCAA rule that allowed players to redshirt after appearing in a maximum of four games, Bryant, a senior, would have to sit the remainder of the year in order to save his remaining eligibility.

Syracuse opened the scoring in the game by scoring field goals on each of their first two drives. Trevor Lawrence led a 60-yard drive that ended with a one-yard touchdown run by Travis Etienne to make the score 7–6 Clemson at the end of the first quarter. Syracuse's Eric Dungey responded with a 70-yard drive that ended with him scoring a one-yard rushing touchdown to take the lead for the Orange. The following Clemson drive ended with Trevor Lawrence taking a hard hit to the head. He would not re-enter the game, and since Kelly Bryant could not enter the game without burning his redshirt, third string quarterback Chase Brice would need to lead the Clemson comeback. Syracuse kicked another field goal to bring the score to 16–7 Syracuse at halftime.

In the third quarter, Greg Huegel kicked 43- and 37-yard field goals for Clemson to bring the score to 16–13 in favor of Syracuse. The Orange extended their lead to 10 points after recovering a muffed punt at the Clemson 10 yard line, after which Eric Dungey scored on a one-yard touchdown run. Travis Etienne cut the deficit back to three points with a 26-yard touchdown run with 11 minutes remaining in the fourth quarter. With six minutes remaining, Chase Brice and Etienne led the go-ahead, 94-yard scoring drive that ended with a one-yard touchdown run by Etienne with 41 seconds remaining in the game. Syracuse failed to move the ball in the final seconds, helped by two sacks by Clemson freshman Xavier Thomas, and the game was over. Travis Etienne ended with a career high 203 rushing yards and three touchdowns.

at Wake Forest

The Tigers' next game was a conference road game against Wake Forest. Clemson dominated the game, 63–3.

Quarterback Trevor Lawrence, back from the head injury he sustained the previous week, started the game. The Tigers offense struggled early in the game, failing to score on their first three drives. Travis Etienne opened the scoring in the first quarter with a 59-yard touchdown run. He added another touchdown run early in the second quarter to bring the score to 14–0. Trevor Lawrence passed for two first half touchdowns, first on a 55-yard connection to Justyn Ross, then on a 20-yard pass to Tee Higgins just before the half. In the third quarter, Etienne scored another long touchdown, this one from 70 yards on Clemson's first offensive play of the second half. Wake Forest scored their only points of the game, a 25-yard field goal by Nick Sciba, in the third quarter. Clemson running back Lyn-J Dixon scored two second half touchdowns, including a 65-yard touchdown run. Adam Choice had a 64-yard touchdown run as well. Etienne, Dixon, and Choice all surpassed 125 rushing yards on the day, the first time three Clemson players each surpassed that mark in one game. Players said they considered the rushing performance by the team a fitting tribute to former Clemson running back C.J. Fuller, a member of the 2016 championship team that died unexpectedly from a blood clot the week of this game.

NC State

After Clemson's win against Wake Forest, the Tigers returned home to face their first ranked opponent in 2018, the 16th-ranked NC State Wolfpack. Clemson won in a rout, 41–7.

Clemson's first drive of the game was a 57-yard drive that ended with a three-yard touchdown run by Travis Etienne. Later in the first quarter, Trevor Lawrence completed a 46-yard touchdown pass to Tee Higgins as the Tigers jumped out to an early 14–0 lead. With 46 seconds left in the first half, Etienne ran for another short touchdown from two yards out. NC State quarterback Ryan Finley threw an interception to Clemson defender K'Von Wallace, who returned it to the NC State 4 yard line with 19 seconds in the half. Greg Huegel converted the 28-yard field goal to bring the score to 24–0 Clemson at halftime. In the third quarter, Travis Etienne scored his third touchdown of the day, a one-yard run that extended Clemson's lead to 31–0. NC State scored their only points on the day via a nine-yard touchdown run by Reggie Gallaspy II early in the fourth quarter. Clemson added another field goal by Huegel and a two-yard touchdown run by Lyn-J Dixon before the end of the game. Trevor Lawrence finished with a career best 308 passing yards in the game.

at Florida State

Following the home win against NC State, Clemson traveled to Tallahassee, Florida to face Florida State, seeking to become the first ACC team to ever beat the Seminoles in four consecutive years. Clemson did so by winning in dominant fashion, 59–10.

Both offenses were held scoreless in the first quarter. Early in the second quarter, Trevor Lawrence opened the scoring for the Tigers with a seven-yard touchdown pass to Tee Higgins. The next Clemson drive ended the same way, with a three-yard touchdown pass from Lawrence to Higgins. Later in the quarter, Clemson lined up on the goal-line in a "Fridge Package" with defensive linemen Christian Wilkins and Dexter Lawrence in the backfield. Wilkins received the handoff and scored his first career rushing touchdown. Clemson scored another touchdown via a two-yard run by tight end Garrett Williams to bring the score to 28–0 before the half. In Clemson's first drive of the second half, Trevor Lawrence connected with Amari Rodgers for a 58-yard touchdown pass. The two connected again later in the quarter for a 68-yard score, after which it was 45–0 Clemson. Florida State kicker Ricky Aguayo completed a 35-yard field goal in the third quarter to break up the shutout. In the fourth quarter, Clemson running back Adam Choice scored on a 15-yard run. Florida State's final points came via a 73-yard pass from quarterback James Blackman to Keyshawn Helton with 4:43 left to go in the game. The final score of 59–10 was Florida State's worst home loss in program history.

Louisville

After the win against Florida State, Clemson returned home once again to play Louisville. The Tigers won in another blowout, 77–16.

Clemson received the kickoff the start the game, and on their opening drive marched down the field 75 yards and scored via a 10-yard touchdown run by Travis Etienne. The next Clemson drive was over after one play thanks to a 70-yard touchdown run by Tavien Feater, and the Tigers were up 14–0 less than three minutes into the game. After Louisville kicked a 25-yard field goal, Clemson finished another 75-yard drive with an 11-yard touchdown completion from Trevor Lawrence to Tee Higgins. Early in the second quarter, Louisville quarterback Jawon Pass threw a pass that was intercepted by Clemson's Isaiah Simmons and returned 27 yards for a touchdown. In the final minute of the half, Lawrence completed a three yard touchdown pass to Amari Rogers, and the score was 35–3 at halftime.

Early in the third quarter, Clemson brought out the "Fridge Package" on the goal-line, as they had done the week prior against Florida State. This time it was defensive lineman Dexter Lawrence that scored his first career rushing touchdown from two yards out. Louisville's next drive ended in another intercepted pass, returned to the Louisville nine yard line by Tanner Muse. Clemson running back Tavien Foster scored a three-yard touchdown three plays later. Backup quarterback Chase Brice played the rest of the game, and his next two drives ended in touchdown passes, first on a six-yard pass to Trevion Thompson, then on a 59-yard completion to Justyn Ross, after which the score was 63–3, still in the third quarter. Louisville's Steven Sawicki returned the ensuing kick-off 93 yards for their first touchdown of the day. Clemson running back Lyn-J Dixon ended the next drive with a 55-yard touchdown run. Louisville added another touchdown via a 10-yard run by Malik Cunningham, and Clemson ended the scoring on the day with Chase Brice's third touchdown pass, to Will Swinney for eight yards. Clemson's 77 points on the day were the most for the Tigers since an 82–24 victory over Wake Forest in Clemson's 1981 championship season.

at Boston College

Clemson next traveled to play 17th-ranked Boston College in Chestnut Hill, Massachusetts, with a chance to clinch the ACC's Atlantic Division for the fourth consecutive year. The Tigers did just that, winning the game handily, 27–7.

Clemson received the kick-off and got as far as the Boston College 12 yard line but settled for a 30-yard field goal to take the 3–0 lead. Boston College's first possession ended with starting quarterback Anthony Brown being taken down by Clemson defensive lineman Christian Wilkins, suffering an apparent injury. He walked off the field under his own power but did not return to the game. Clemson's next possession ended in a punt, which was returned 74 yards for a touchdown by Boston College's Michael Walker. Clemson responded with a 70-yard touchdown drive that ended with a two-yard pass from Trevor Lawrence to Milan Richard to retake the lead. Clemson added another field goal from 23 yards out early in the second quarter. Both teams failed to score for the rest of the half, and the 13–7 score carried into halftime. Clemson's first offensive drive of the second half ended with Trevor Lawrence's first career rushing touchdown, a six yard run. Early in the fourth quarter, Amari Rogers returned a Boston College punt 58 yards for a touchdown, which brought the score to 27–7, which held until the end of the game.

Duke

Clemson's last conference game was a home game against Duke. The Tigers secured a perfect conference finish by beating the Blue Devils 35–6.

Clemson's offense started out slow, punting on each of their first three drives, and the defense allowed two Duke field goals, bringing the score to 6–0 in favor of Duke at the end of the first quarter. But Clemson completed a 75-yard drive that ended with a two-yard Tavien Feaster touchdown run early in the second quarter to take the lead. With 1:16 left in the first half, the Tigers added another touchdown via a 19-yard pass from Trevor Lawrence to Justyn Ross, and the score was 14–6 at the half. In the second half, Clemson scored on three straight drives to bring the game out of reach. First, Travis Etienne scored a 27-yard touchdown run, followed by a 29-yard touchdown run on the next drive. Trevor Lawrence completed a 10-yard touchdown pass to T.J. Chase early in the fourth quarter to bring the score to 35–6, which held until the end of the game. Lawrence finished with 251 yards and two touchdowns on the day.

South Carolina

Clemson's last game of the regular season was against in-state rival South Carolina, a member of the Southeastern Conference. Clemson won the game 56–35 to secure a perfect 12–0 regular season, their first since 2015 and third in school history.

South Carolina received the opening kick-off, and marched down the field 75 yards on their first drive and scored on a nine-yard touchdown pass from Jake Bentley to Deebo Samuel. Clemson responded with their own 75-yard drive, which ended with a one-yard score by Adam Choice. The next Clemson drive ended with a 22-yard touchdown pass from Trevor Lawrence to Tee Higgins, bringing the score to 14–7 Clemson. One drive later, defensive lineman Christian Wilkins scored on fourth and one from the South Carolina one yard line, his second rushing touchdown on the year. South Carolina responded with a 67-yard touchdown pass from Bentley to Kiel Pollard, and the score was 21–14 Clemson in the second quarter. Clemson and South Carolina traded touchdowns again before the end of the half, first with Clemson's Adam Choice scoring a two-yard touchdown run, followed by a 75-yard connection from South Carolina's Jake Bentley to Deebo Samuel. Clemson's Greg Huegel missed a 39-yard field goal at the end of the half, and the score was 28–21 Clemson at halftime.

The Tigers started the second half with a 10-play, 75-yard drive that ended with a 2-yard touchdown run by Travis Etienne. The two following Clemson drives ended with a 13-yard touchdown run by Tavien Feaster and then a 15-yard touchdown run by Adam Choice to extend their lead to 49–21 early in the fourth quarter. South Carolina added two touchdowns, first by a 32-yard touchdown pass from Bentley to Samuel, then by a 20-yard touchdown pass from Bentley to Shi Smith with 3:37 left to play. Travis Etienne added another Clemson touchdown via a 7-yard run in the last minute of the game, bringing the final score to 56–35. The 35 points surrendered by the Tigers was the most given up by the team since the 2016 ACC Championship Game against Virginia Tech. Trevor Lawrence threw for a career-high 393 yards in the game.

Pittsburgh – ACC Championship Game

Clemson, champions of the Atlantic Coast Conference's Atlantic Division, faced off against Coastal Division champion Pittsburgh in the 2018 ACC Championship Game, played in Charlotte, North Carolina. Clemson won the game in a blowout, 42–10, to secure their fourth consecutive ACC title.

On the very first offensive play of the game, Clemson running back Travis Etienne ran 75 yards for a touchdown to give the Tigers the early lead. Later in the first quarter, Clemson safety Isaiah Simmons forced a Pittsbugh fumble on their own 21 yard line, which was returned to the three yard line by Christian Wilkins. Travis Etienne scored on a three-yard run on the next play. Pittsburgh got on the board later in the quarter with a 37-yard field goal by Alex Kessman. A one-yard touchdown run by Pittsburgh's Qadree Ollison made the score 14–10 Clemson midway through the second quarter. Trevor Lawrence extended the lead with a five-yard touchdown completion to Tee Higgins. In the final minute of the half, Pittsburgh quarterback Kenny Pickett threw an interception to Clemson's A.J. Terrell, who returned it to the Pittsburgh 10 yard line. Lawrence and Higgins connected again on the following play to bring the score to 28–10 at halftime.

Both offenses were held scoreless in the third quarter. In the early fourth quarter, Adam Choice closed out a 69-yard Clemson drive with a one-yard touchdown run. Later in the quarter, Lyn-J Dixon scored on a four-yard touchdown run, bringing the score to 42–10, which held until the end of the game. Travis Etienne finished with 156 rushing yards and two touchdowns in the game.

Notre Dame – Cotton Bowl

In the final College Football Playoff rankings of the year, released on December 2, Clemson was ranked second, which earned them a spot in the CFP semi-final to be played at the 2018 Cotton Bowl Classic. Their opponent was the Notre Dame Fighting Irish, ranked third by the playoff committee and also undefeated. The winner would go on to the 2019 College Football Playoff National Championship to play the winner of the other semi-final game, the 2018 Orange Bowl. Clemson opened as an 11.5-point favorite against the Irish by Las Vegas sportsbooks. Prior to the game, starting defensive lineman Dexter Lawrence and two backups, Zach Giella and Braden Galloway, tested positive for a banned substance, ostarine, and were told by the NCAA they must sit out the Cotton Bowl while awaiting results of further tests.

The Cotton Bowl Classic began with both teams trading field goals in the first quarter. Early in the second quarter, Clemson scored their first touchdown via a 52-yard touchdown pass from Trevor Lawrence to Justyn Ross. Greg Huegel's extra point attempt was blocked, and the score was 9–3 Clemson. Lawrence and Ross connected again later in the quarter, this time on a 42-yard touchdown pass with 1:44 left to go in the half. Clemson got the ball back with 46 seconds to go, and Trevor Lawrence led an 80-yard drive in that time that ended with a 19-yard pass to Tee Higgins to extend their lead to 23–3 at halftime. In the third quarter, Travis Etienne scored on a 62-yard touchdown run. Both teams failed to score for the rest of the game, and 30–3 was the final score. Trevor Lawrence finished with 327 yards and was awarded MVP of the game along with defensive lineman Austin Bryant.

Alabama – CFP National Championship

By winning the Cotton Bowl Classic, Clemson advanced to the 2019 College Football Playoff National Championship to play the winner of the Orange Bowl, Alabama. This was Clemson's third appearance in the CFP championship game in four years, all of which were played against Alabama. The Crimson Tide won their first CFP match-up in 2016 (2015 season), and Clemson won the rematch in 2017 (2016 season). The Crimson Tide and Tigers also met in the CFP semi-finals the previous season, where Alabama was victorious in the 2018 Sugar Bowl. Alabama opened as the 6.5-point favorite in the 2019 match-up. The three Clemson players that had been suspended for the Cotton Bowl for testing positive for a banned substance, including Dexter Lawrence, were again suspended for the national championship game after NCAA tests confirmed the prior results.

Clemson received the opening kickoff of the Championship Game but was forced to punt after a three-and-out. The following Alabama drive ended in an uncharacteristic pick-six interception thrown by Alabama's Tua Tagovailoa, returned 44 yards by A.J. Terrell after being tipped by blitzing safety Isaiah Simmons in the backfield. Alabama responded with a three-play, 75-yard drive that ended with a 62-yard touchdown from Tagovaila to Jerry Jeudy to even the score at seven apiece. Clemson's next drive included a 62-yard pass from Trevor Lawrence to Tee Higgins and ended with a 17-yard touchdown by Travis Etienne. The high-scoring first quarter continued as Alabama marched down the field again and scored on a one-yard pass from Tagovailoa to Hale Hentges. Alabama's extra point missed, and the score was 14–13 Clemson at the end of the first quarter. Early in the second quarter, Alabama's Joseph Bulovas kicked a 25-yard field goal to take the lead for the Crimson Tide.
Clemson's next two drives both ended with Travis Etienne touchdowns, the first a one-yard run and the second a five-yard reception from Trevor Lawrence. Clemson kicked a 36-yard field goal in the final minute of the half, bringing a 31–16 lead into halftime.

In the second half, Alabama received the kick and advanced to the Clemson 24 yard line, but failed to convert a fake field goal on 4th and 6, turning the ball over. Clemson scored three plays later via a 74-yard pass from Trevor Lawrence to Justyn Ross. Alabama was again stopped on their next drive, and Clemson marched 89 yards down the field to score a five-yard touchdown pass from Lawrence to Tee Higgins, after which the score was 44–16 at the end of the third quarter. Clemson's defense held the Alabama offense scoreless on the next two drives. The Tigers received the ball on their own one yard line with 10:02 left to go in the game, and were able to completely wind down the clock over the course of a 14-play, 94-yard drive that ended the game. Trevor Lawrence threw for 347 yards and three touchdowns in the game and was named offensive MVP. Cornerback Trayvon Mullen, who intercepted a first-half pass by Tua Tagovailoa and returned it 46 yards, was named defensive MVP.

Awards and honors

2019 NFL Draft

The 2019 NFL Draft was held on April 25–27 in Nashville, Tennessee. Six Clemson players were selected as part of the draft, including a school record three taken in the first round. Five additional Clemson players were signed to NFL teams as undrafted free agents.

Undrafted Free Agents

Notes

 Clemson scored a total of 664 points during the season, which set a school record.

Legacy

Multiple analysts and media outlets have discussed the 2018 Clemson team as being one of the best in college football history, in league with 2001 Miami, 1995 Nebraska, and other all-time great teams, due to its historic margin of victory (32 points per game), record (15–0), and dominance in victories over highly ranked teams. Clemson became the first team in over forty years to beat two top 5 teams (AP Poll) by at least 25 points. Clemson accomplished the feat in 11 days. The Tigers won 13 of 15 games by at least 20 points, including the last ten in a row.

The Tigers' national championship victory celebration at the White House made headlines due to the government shutdown. The White House residence staff, which would normally prepare the meal, was not working so President Donald Trump personally ordered large amounts of fast food including burgers, french fries and pizza, for the team. Despite widespread controversy, some of the Clemson players said they enjoyed the meal and the experience.

References

Clemson
Atlantic Coast Conference football champion seasons
Clemson Tigers football seasons
College Football Playoff National Champions
Cotton Bowl Classic champion seasons
College football undefeated seasons
Clemson Tigers football